Institute of Freedom and Direct Democracy is a think-tank affiliated with Institute of Freedom and Direct Democracy.

History
Freedom and Direct Democracy announced intention to form its ow think-tank in November 2021. Institute was founded in February 2022 with Josef Nerušil becoming its first Chairman.

References

Freedom and Direct Democracy
Think tanks based in the Czech Republic
2022 establishments in the Czech Republic